SNW may refer to:
 Star Trek: Strange New Worlds, TV series
 Super Nintendo World, a theme park
 Storage Networking World, a conference for data storage professionals
 SNW1, a protein
 snw, ISO 639-3 code for the Santrokofi language
 SNW, ICAO code for Sun West Airlines
 SNW, IATA airport code for Thandwe Airport, Myanmar
 S. N. W. Hulugalle, Ceylonese colonial-era legislator and headmen